The scarlet-faced liocichla (Liocichla ripponi) is a bird in the family Leiothrichidae. The species was recently reclassified as separate from the red-faced liocichla, although some taxonomists consider it to be conspecific.  It is found in Myanmar, Thailand, Vietnam, and southern China.

References

Collar, N. J. & Robson C. 2007. Family Timaliidae (Babblers)  pp. 70 – 291 in; del Hoyo, J., Elliott, A. & Christie, D.A. eds. Handbook of the Birds of the World, Vol. 12. Picathartes to Tits and Chickadees. Lynx Edicions, Barcelona.

scarlet-faced liocichla
Birds of Myanmar
Birds of Thailand
Birds of Laos
Birds of Vietnam
Birds of South China
Birds of Yunnan
scarlet-faced liocichla
scarlet-faced liocichla